Robert Dukinfield Darbishire (1826–1908) was a prominent Manchester lawyer and philanthropist.

Biography 

Robert Dukinfield Darbishire's father, Samuel Dukinfield Darbishire (1799-1870), was a founder of Manchester Athenaeum and Manchester New College. Darbishire was a lay student for four years and worked for his father's law office. He graduated from the University of London in 1845.

In 1857, he became the lay secretary of the Manchester College, and served for 37 years, including 22 years with his friend Charles Beard.

Darbishire was instrumental in setting up the Whitworth Art Gallery and was a founding member of the Manchester High School for Girls.

Philanthropy
Darbishire left money in his will to found the Darbishire House Health Centre, which paved the way for a number of organisations, including the Robert Darbishire Practice, the University of Manchester Department of General Practice and the Centre for Primary Care Research (later the National Primary Care Research and Development Centre).

Darbishire was one of the first major donors to the Manchester Museum, giving over 700 items to their collection from 1904 onwards. He was part of a Manchester network of acquirers who would buy many artifacts and then donate them to the city's institutions.

Darbishire was a particular advocate of women's right to education.

Art collection 
 Wedgwood Manufactory's copy of the Portland Vase

References

1908 deaths
1826 births
English philanthropists
19th-century English lawyers
19th-century British philanthropists
Manchester Literary and Philosophical Society
Lancashire and Cheshire Antiquarian Society